Poliaenus nuevoleonis is a species of beetle in the family Cerambycidae. It was described by Chemsak and Linsley in 1975.

Subspecies
 Poliaenus nuevoleonis nuevoleonis Chemsak & Linsley, 1975
 Poliaenus nuevoleonis similnegundo Skiles, 1979

References

Pogonocherini
Beetles described in 1975